Kasar Devi is a village near Almora, Uttarakhand. It is known for the Kasar Devi temple, a Devi temple, dedicated to Kasar Devi, after whom the place is also named. The temple structure dates to the 2nd century CE. Swami Vivekananda visited Kasar Devi in 1890s, and numerous western seeker, Sunyata Baba Alfred Sorensen and  Lama Anagarika Govinda.

It's believed that this temple is positioned on the earth's Van Allen Belt. The region surrounding the Kasar Devi Temple has an enormous geomagnetic field, thanks to gaps in bands of radiation. As a result, Kasar Devi is endowed with a cosmic energy similar to that of Stonehenge in UK and Machu Pichu in Peru.

Also known as Hippie Hill or Crank's Ridge, Kasar Devi Temple complex has always been a melting pot of art, spiritualism and poetry. Singer Bob Dylan and actor Uma Thurman, have made this popular and today Kasar Devi continues to attract folks looking for answers to life's challenging questions.

The temple hosts the annual "Kasar Devi Fair" on Kartik Poornima (November–December).

History

Kasar Devi first became known when in the 1890s, Swami Vivekananda visited and meditated here and has mentioned his experience in his diaries. Walter Evans-Wentz, a pioneer in the study of Tibetan Buddhism, who later translated The Tibetan Book of the Dead, stayed here for some time.

Then in the 1930s, Danish mystic Sunyata Baba (Alfred Sorensen) came here and lived here the over three decades, as did Ernst Hoffman, who became Tibetan Buddhist Lama Anagarika Govinda and Li Goutami. This led to a series of spiritual seekers from the west, visiting them. In 1961, Govinda was visited by Beat poets, Allen Ginsberg, Peter Orlovsky and Gary Snyder.  In later history, at the peak of the Hippie movement, the area also became a part of the Hippie trail. Crank's Ridge, colloquially known as Hippie Hill, which lies ahead of Kasar Devi became a popular destination. It became home to several bohemian artists, writers and western Tibetan Buddhists, and even visited by mystic-saint Anandamayi Ma. The ridge got its name amongst hippy circles, after American psychologist Timothy Leary streaked here in the 1960s. Leary wrote majority of his ‘psychedelic prayers’ here.  Thus, through the 1960 and 1970s, the area was visited by personalities of the counter-culture, George Harrison and Cat Stevens, Western Buddhist Robert Thurman,  and writer D. H. Lawrence, who spent two summers here.

Kasar Devi temple
  The village is mainly known for the Kasar Devi temple, the shrine dedicated to Kasar Devi. The temple itself, dates back to the 2nd century CE. A winding walkway from gateway on the main road, right the beginning of the village, leads up to the temple.

The area is home to deodar and pine forests. It also provides views not just of Almora and the Hawalbagh Valley, but also of the panoramic view of the Himalayas from Bandarpunch peak on the Himachal Pradesh border to Api Himal in Nepal.

A large fair, known as Kasar Devi Fair, is held at the Kasar Devi temple on the occasion of Kartik Poornima in the Hindu calendar, corresponding to November and December.

The temple consist of two different group of temple one of devi and another of lord shiva and bairava. The main temple consist of akhand jyoti which keep on burning 24 hours for years. It has also a dhuni  (havan kund) where wood log are burned 24 hours . The ash of dhuni is said to be very powerful that can even cure any  mental patient.

The Hill top provides beautiful scene of the valley and Himalayas  that make it a place suitable for photography.

The main shrine of devi is situated inside a cave like formation by the huge rocks. City buses, taxies and cabs can take you there at suitable prices . But it can also be reached by hiking and trekking.

Overview and mystery 
Kasar Devi is situated on a hilltop, on the edge of a ridge off the Almora-Bageshwar highway on the Kaashay hills of Kumaon Himalayas. As it is situated above the ridge of Almora town, it is accessible through eight-km hike from Almora or 10 km by road. One km away is the village of Kalimath popular with tourists. Also close by is the Binsar Wildlife Sanctuary, which lies 30 km away.

It is being developed as a tourist place in Uttarakhand and Uttarakhand government have many plans to develop this place.  Presently the work of construction of ropeway  from the district headquarter to Kasar Devi is in progress.

References

External links

 

Kumaon division
Almora
Tourist attractions in Uttarakhand
Hindu temples in Uttarakhand